Daniela Aedo (born Daniela Aedo Santana on February 12, 1995, in Mexico City, D.F., Mexico) is a Mexican actress.

Career

Acting
In 1999, at the age of 4, she auditioned to participate in a children's telenovela. From among thousands of girls, she was chosen to star in Carita de Ángel. In 2000, she made an appearance in the telenovela Dare to forget me, in the role of Andrea (girl). In 2002, she participated in her second successful children's telenovela, called ¡Vivan los Niños! in the Nicandro Díaz production, alongside Andrea Legarreta. In 2004, she starred in the telenovela Contra Viento y Marea, where she once again played the role of Sandra (girl). Then, after a long period of inactivity, she returned to soap operas in 2008, appearing in My Sin.

Music
Aedo is a guitarist, singer and songwriter. In 2013 she was accepted to Berklee College of Music.

She had two concerts in Latin America, one in Mexico City, at the Bataclán forum, and another in Buenos Aires, Argentina, at Mediterránea Café Teatro, presenting original songs from her next album, and presenting her next single. On her YouTube channel, she has talked about her artistic career and her musical studies.

Due to the COVID-19 pandemic, she confined her concerts to her YouTube channel.

Filmography

Discography
Carita de ángel (2000)
¡Vivan los niños! (2002)

Awards and nominations

References

External links

1995 births
Living people
Mexican child actresses
Mexican telenovela actresses
Mexican television actresses
Actresses from Mexico City
20th-century Mexican actresses
21st-century Mexican actresses